ʻAbd al-Jalīl (ALA-LC romanization of ) is a Muslim male given name, also used by Christians, and in modern usage, surname. It is built from the Arabic words ʻabd and al-Jalīl, one of the names of God in the Qur'an, which give rise to the Muslim theophoric names. It means "servant of the Exalted".

It may refer to:

Given name
Abdul Jalil I of Johor (1562–1571), Sultan of Johor
Ali Jalla Abdul Jalil Shah II (died 1597), Sultan of Johor
Abdul Jalilul Jabbar (ruled 1649–1652), Sultan of Brunei
Gregorios Abdul Jaleel (died 1681), Syriac Orthodox Bishop of Jerusalem
Abdul Jalil of Perak (died 1918), Sultan of Perak
Qazi Abdul Jaleel, known as Amar Jaleel (born 1936), Pakistani writer and journalist
Fayeq Abdul-Jaleel (1948 – ca. 1991), Kuwaiti poet and playwright
Mustafa Abdul Jalil (born 1952), Libyan politician
Abduljalil Khalil (born 1961), Bahraini politician
Abdeljalil El Hajji (born 1969), Moroccan footballer
Abdul Jalil Memon (1970–2009), Pakistani politician
Abdeljalil Hadda (born 1972), Moroccan footballer
Abdul Jeleel Ajagun (born 1993), Nigerian footballer
Abdul Jolil (Bangladesh politician)

Surname
Shahrizat Abdul Jalil (born 1953), Malaysian politician

Other
Abdul Jaleel (tribe), Palestinian tribe
Sultan Abdul Jalil Shah Bridge, bridge in Perak, Malaysia

References

Arabic masculine given names